Harry Kleiner (September 10, 1916 Tiflis, Russian Empire – October 17, 2007 Chicago, Illinois) was a Russian Empire-born American screenwriter and producer best known for his films at 20th Century Fox.

Select filmography
Fallen Angel (1945)
The Dark Corner (1946) - uncredited
The Street with No Name (1948)
Red Skies of Montana (1952)
Kangaroo (1952)
Salome (1953)
Miss Sadie Thompson (1953)
King of the Khyber Rifles (1953)
Carmen Jones (1954)
House of Bamboo (1955)
The Violent Men (1955)
Cry Tough (1957) - also producer
The Rabbit Trap (1959) - producer only
The Garment Jungle (1959) - and producer
Ice Palace (1960)
A Fever in the Blood (1961)
Bus Stop (1962) (TV series)
The Virginian (1965) (TV series)
Fantastic Voyage (1966)
Bullitt (1968)
Le Mans (1971)
Judgment: The Trial of Julius and Ethel Rosenberg (1974) (TV film)
Extreme Prejudice (1987)
Red Heat (1988)

References

External links
 

1916 births
2007 deaths
20th-century American screenwriters
Writers from Tbilisi
American film producers
Soviet emigrants to the United States